The Dodeka Keyboard design is an isomorphic keyboard invented and designed by Jacques-Daniel Rochat. It is similar to a piano keyboard but with only a single row of keys containing each chromatic note. The keys corresponding to C, E and A flat are highlighted to provide visual landmarks. The creators aimed to create a rational and chromatic approach to music and performance. As an isomorphic keyboard, any musical sequence or interval has the same shape in each of the 12 keys.

Music notation 
The Dodeka design was developed together with the Dodeka Music Notation. It consists of a four-line chromatic staff, and represents rhythms only using the visual length of a bar on the staff, reminiscent of the appearance of "piano roll" in digital audio workstations.

See also 
 Isomorphic Keyboards
 Jankó keyboard

References

External links 
 AltKeyboard
 Dodeka Music, Dodeka keyboard website

Electric and electronic keyboard instruments
Isomorphic keyboard layouts